Enterprice is a British comedy-drama written by, and starring Kayode Ewumi. The show's co-stars are Trieve Blackwood-Cambridge, Thea Gajic, Roger Griffiths, and Tanya Moodie. Enterprice portrays two young entrepreneurs from South London: Kazim (Ewumi) and Jeremiah (Blackwood-Cambridge) as they try to escape the hustle and get their brand new delivery service business "Speedi-Kazz" off the ground.

BBC Three aired the Enterprice pilot in November 2017 with Daniel Ezra in the role of Jeremiah. In early 2018, shortly after the pilot aired, the BBC commissioned the first series, consisting of four episodes. In this first series, Blackwood-Cambridge replaced Ezra in the lead role of Jeremiah.

The first series of Enterprice premiered on BBC iPlayer on 29 November 2018 and was broadcast on BBC One on Friday nights during December 2018. In April 2019 Enterprice was renewed by BBC Three for a second series, which debuted on 8 March 2020.

Also in April 2019, Enterprice was nominated in the category of Favourite Comedy Production/Performer in the 2019 Screen Nation Film and Television Awards.

Episodes

Series overview

Series 1 (2018)

Series 2 (2020)

References 

2018 British television series debuts
Black British television shows
British comedy-drama films
British comedy-drama television shows